In the Still of the Night (Czech: Za tichých noci) is a 1941 Czech drama film directed by Zdeněk Gina Hašler and starring Lída Baarová, Lilly Hodáčová and Karel Höger.

It was made during the German occupation of Czechoslovakia. The film's sets were designed by the art director Ferdinand Fiala. It was distributed in Germany by Tobis Film.

Cast
 Lída Baarová as Jana Radimská
 Lilly Hodáčová as Marianne Singer  
 Karel Höger as Záviš Herold  
 Karel Hašler as Karel Hašler  
 Rudolf Deyl as Der Hofrat  
 Antonie Nedošinská as Frau/Paní Bilian  
 Růžena Šlemrová as Frau/Paní Rajská
 Světla Svozilová as Rosa
 Marie Blažková as Anna Trunečková
 Karel Veverka as Bohdan Kaminsky 
 Raoul Schránil as Peter Rajský
 Vladimír Řepa as Pfarrer
 František Kreuzmann as Baron 
 František V. Kučera as Senior Clerk

References

Bibliography 
 Bock, Hans-Michael & Bergfelder, Tim. The Concise CineGraph. Encyclopedia of German Cinema. Berghahn Books, 2009.

External links 
 

1941 films
Czech drama films
1941 drama films
1940s Czech-language films
Films directed by Zdenek Gina Hasler
Czechoslovak drama films
Czech black-and-white films
1940s Czech films